The Battle of Chaksana was fought between the Mughal Empire and the Maratha Empire in 1788. The Marathas were led by the famous Maratha general Mahadaji Shinde and the Mughal forces were led by the Uyghur general of the Mughal Army, Isma'il Beg. After a long and fierce battle, it ended with the Marathas eventually retreating.

References

Chaksana 1788
Chaksana
1788 in India
Chaksana